Phenylobacterium haematophilum is a Gram negative, rod-shaped and non-spore-formin bacterium from the genus of Phenylobacterium which has been isolated from human blood from Göteborg in Sweden.

References

Caulobacterales
Bacteria described in 2008